Ludwig Hugo Becker (July 19, 1833 in Wesel - December 25, 1868 in Düsseldorf) was a painter and etcher. Becker was born at Wesel and studied landscape painting under Schirmer and Gude, at Düsseldorf, about 1852. He afterwards visited Westphalia, the Upper Rhine, the Moselle, Switzerland, Normandy, and the neighbourhood of the Baltic. In 1861 he was awarded a medal at Metz. He died at Düsseldorf in 1868. Among his landscapes the most important are:

The Sacrifice of the Old Germans (in possession of Gl. v. Gröben).
The Passing Storm.
Sunday Morning.
The Shepherd on the Pasture.
Christmas Eve.
The Vine-crop on the Moselle.

See also
 List of German painters

References
 

19th-century German painters
19th-century German male artists
German male painters
German engravers
People from Wesel
1834 births
1868 deaths
German etchers